The Batman rapist is an unidentified English serial sex offender who committed at least seventeen sexual assaults on women in the city of Bath, Somerset, between 1991 and 2000. He is the subject of Britain's longest–running serial rape investigation, codenamed Operation Eagle, and has now eluded capture for more than thirty years. Detective Inspector Paul James of Avon and Somerset Constabulary, leading the operation, said it is "one of the most complicated and protracted investigations" that the force has ever undertaken. 

The perpetrator was nicknamed after leaving a baseball cap bearing a logo from the Batman film series at the scene of one attack. Police believe that there are more victims who have never come forward. The independent crime-fighting charity Crimestoppers UK have offered a £10,000 reward for information leading to his capture. The perpetrator has also been referred to in the news media as the "Riddler".

Modus operandi
Police say that the Batman rapist has a detailed geographical knowledge of Bath and operates in "a specific hunting ground". All but one of his crimes have taken place in Bath, usually in the Bathwick area of the city, the exception being the abduction and rape of a 19-year-old woman in Kingswood, near Bristol, in September 1996. 

The perpetrator's crimes usually take place during the darker winter months. He targets lone women who have just returned to their cars, abducting them at knifepoint before forcing them to drive to secluded areas in the south of the city where he then attacks them. He removes their underwear and rips their tights during the rapes, but then makes them put them back on after the rape is over. After raping his victim, he often forces them to drive back to the area where he abducted them. The perpetrator has attacked women of all ages, and in May 2000 attempted to carjack a 26-year-old woman in Bath while her seven-year-old daughter was in the car.

In October 2000, to coincide with the end of British Summer Time, Avon and Somerset Constabulary delivered leaflets to 25,000 homes in Bath—the biggest leaflet drop in the history of British criminal investigation—asking women to complete a checklist about friends, acquaintances, neighbours or relatives who might fit the profile of:
 a white male
 slim or medium build
 aged between 30 and 50
 knows the Bath area well, and has some connection with Bristol, particularly the Kingswood area, and can drive a car
 has a tights fetish and could persuade his consenting sexual partners to wear tights, which he may rip during intercourse
 sometimes wears a baseball cap
 has aroused suspicion with absences from home during the evening and early hours of the morning

The rapist has long periods of apparent inactivity, including a three-year gap between October 1991 and November 1994, followed by a further two years of apparent inactivity until June 1996. Police suspected there were other attacks during these lulls in activity, although a spokesman has said "Another possibility to explain the long gaps is that this is a man who comes to the area infrequently, possibly for work reasons." His attacks may also take place while the rapist is between relationships. His attacks are usually between 6pm and 8pm, "possibly on the way home from work", or between 1am and 3am, and he may have convictions for car-related crimes "because of the ease with which he breaks into vehicles."

Physical description 
Victims described him as wearing black clothing and a baseball cap. He was slim, clean shaven and is about 5 ft 9ins tall with blue eyes. He has a scar below his bottom lip.

Crimewatch
The case was highlighted on the BBC's Crimewatch on 25 January 2000, including an appeal from Avon and Somerset Constabulary for information from the public. As a result of the appeal, six previously unknown victims came forward. Callers also gave the names of four potential suspects, including the son of a British diplomat, and "dozens of calls were received from prostitutes and partners of people with similar sexual habits".

Suspects
One theory considered by police was that the rapist had been in prison or away from the area while serving as a member of the armed forces, based on his inactivity between October 1991 and November 1994 and between February 1997 and January 1999. Detectives later learned that these periods coincided with dates when a diplomat's son, whose name had been given by a caller to Crimewatch, was out of the country living with his father. Although detectives visited the country where the father works to ascertain if similar attacks had occurred there, no further information has been forthcoming from the police.

DNA
In January 2001, the Forensic Science Service used the Low copy number (LCN) DNA profiling technique to isolate the rapist's DNA "fingerprint". They then began the process of taking swabs for comparison from all the men, believed to be around 2,000 individuals, whose names had come up during the course of the investigation.

Murder of Melanie Hall
Police investigating the abduction and murder of 25-year-old Melanie Hall, who disappeared after a night out in Bath in June 1996, have not ruled out a connection with the rapist. He is known to have attempted to carjack a woman at knifepoint in the same area of the city a few hours before Hall was abducted, leaving his victim wounded when she fought back and managed to escape.

See also
House for sale rapist – another unidentified UK serial rapist, who has been at large since 1979. Suspected to be John Cannan
List of fugitives from justice who disappeared

UK cold cases where the offender's DNA is known:
Murder of Deborah Linsley
Murders of Eve Stratford and Lynne Weedon
Murders of Jacqueline Ansell-Lamb and Barbara Mayo
Murder of Lindsay Rimer
Murder of Lyn Bryant
Murder of Janet Brown
Murder of Linda Cook

References

External links
   January 2000 Crimewatch reconstructions and appeal on the rapist (1:18-13:02)
2020 summary on the case by the local newspaper SomersetLive
2019 article on the case by local newspaper SomersetLive

20th-century English criminals
21st-century English criminals
Crime in Somerset
Criminals from Somerset
Sex crimes in England
English rapists
Fugitives wanted by the United Kingdom
Rape in England
Unidentified British rapists
Unsolved crimes in the United Kingdom